David Cunningham (19 October 1928 – 20 October 2020) was an Australian ice hockey player. He competed in the men's tournament at the 1960 Winter Olympics.

References

External links
 

1928 births
2020 deaths
Australian ice hockey players
Ice hockey players at the 1960 Winter Olympics
Olympic ice hockey players of Australia
Sportspeople from Melbourne
Sportsmen from Victoria (Australia)
People from Brunswick, Victoria